Jukwa Senior High School is a co-educational senior high school, located in Jukwaa in the Central Region of Ghana. It was established in 1991. The school motto is Success means Hardwork. The school's colours are green and yellow.

History
A project to alleviate a lack of water at the school was completed in 2016.

References

See also

 Education in Ghana
 List of senior high schools in Ghana

Central Region (Ghana)
High schools in Ghana
Educational institutions established in 1991
1991 establishments in Ghana